Mala Reka may refer to:

 Mala Reka (Bajina Bašta)
 Mala Reka (Kruševac)
 Mala Reka (Trgovište)